Ciliaria may refer to:
 Ciliaria, a genus of plants in the family Saxifragaceae, synonym of Saxifraga
 Ciliaria, a genus of fungi in the family Pyronemataceae, synonym of Scutellinia